The last actions of the Battle of the Atlantic in American waters took place on 5–6 May 1945.

Background

Thereafter US ships were attacked, and US warships involved in action against U-boats while protecting US interests, in the two years before America’s entry into the war. 
Following Nazi Germany’s declaration of war on the US on 11 December 1941, the U-boat Arm of the Kriegsmarine attacked American shipping in earnest in January 1942 with Operation Drumbeat, sinking over 600 ships (representing 3 million tons of shipping) over a six-month period.

Thereafter the U-boat Arm continued to make offensive patrols against US coastal shipping,  while German wolf-packs searched for and attacked convoys in mid-ocean.
By 1945 U-Boat actions had reduced to pinpricks, but their potential forced the Allies to maintain large naval and air forces, and expend considerable resources, to counter the threat.

During the first five months of 1945, the U-boat Arm dispatched 19 U-boat patrols to American waters, including seven sailings constituting group Seewolf, the last wolf pack of the Battle of the Atlantic. 
By 5 May 1945, the day U-boat Command (BdU) ordered the U Boat Arm to cease hostilities, just nine were still at large; six off the US coast, and three Seewolf boats in mid-ocean. Of these, two were involved in action with the USN, the last actions in American waters during the Atlantic campaign.

First action

On 5 May, lying in wait off Point Judith, Rhode Island, sighted and fired on SS Black Point, a collier underway for Boston, Massachusetts. Twelve men died and 34 were rescued. The next morning, two blimps from Lakehurst, New Jersey — K-16 and K-58 — joined the attack, locating oil slicks and marking suspected locations with smoke and dye markers. K-16 also attacked with  rocket bombs. Finally, planking, life rafts, a chart tabletop, clothing, and an officer's cap floated to the surface, indicating destruction with all 55 men.
U-853 was destroyed at sometime between midnight, when success was first claimed, and 1225, when it was confirmed.

Second action
 
Making a sudden attack, Farquhar closed and dropped 13 depth charges in a single attack, which destroyed U-881 with the loss of all hands.

Conclusion
These were the last U-boats destroyed in action in American waters; on 8 May, the Germans surrendered, and the last active U-boats in American waters gave themselves up to units of the USN and RCN.

See also
Operation Teardrop
Actions of 7–8 May 1945

References
Clay Blair: Hitler's U-Boat War Vol II (1998). New York: Random House. 
Paul Kemp: U-Boats Destroyed (1997). 
Axel Neistle: German U-Boat Losses during World War II (1998).

External links
U-853 at u-boat.net
U-881 at u-boat.net

Battle of the Atlantic